This is a list of educational institutions located in Sialkot District, Pakistan.

Schools

Army Public School, 39 Zafar Ali Road, Sialkot Cantt
Beaconhouse School System, Said Pur Gondal Road, Sialkot Cantt
City School, Iqbal Campus (boys)
Government High School Bogray
Lahore Grammar School, Faraz Shaheed Road, Sialkot
Roots Millennium Schools, Citi Housing Society Daska Road, Sialkot

Tertiary and technical educational institutions

Engineering colleges 

 Superior Group of Colleges kashmir road campus

Women's degree colleges

 Government College Women University, Sialkot

Commerce colleges

SKANS School of Accountancy

Medical colleges

 Islam Medical College
 Khawaja Muhammad Safdar Medical College (Formerly Sialkot Medical College)

Universities

Government College Women University, Sialkot
University of Central Punjab, Sialkot Campus 
University of Management and Technology Sialkot Campus               
University of Sialkot

References

Lists of universities and colleges in Pakistan
Universities and colleges in Sialkot District
Academic institutions in Pakistan